Emily Whelan (born 22 August 2002) is an Irish footballer who plays for Scottish Women's Premier League club Glasgow City and the Republic of Ireland women's national football team. She is a former Gaelic footballer.

Career

Football

Club 
While attending Ardgillan Community College in Balbriggan, Whelan began her career in the Shelbourne Academy and made her debut in the Shelbourne Ladies first-team in August 2018. On 10 November 2018, when she was 16 years old, she was named the best player in the U-17 league and thus the first Continental Tires Women's Under 17 National League Player of the Year.

She signed a one-year professional contract with Women's Super League club Birmingham City in September 2021. After playing 16 times for Birmingham, who were relegated from the Women's Super League, she transferred to Glasgow City of the Scottish Women's Premier League in July 2022.

National team 
After playing five games for the Irish U-17's team, at 16 years of age, Whelan was called-up to play for the Irish senior team against Poland. On 9 October 2018, she made her senior debut as a substitute, in the 86th minute, coming on for Ruesha Littlejohn. On 20 January 2019, she made her second international appearance, after a 76th-minute substitution for Emily Kraft, in a 1–0 defeat by Belgium at the Podoactiva Pinatar Arena Football Centre at San Pedro del Pinatar, Murcia, Spain.

Gaelic football career  
In her youth until 2017, alongside association football, Whelan played Gaelic Football, for the O'Dwyers GAA, and the Dublin Ladies U-16's.

Awards 
Women's National League Awards
 U-17 League Player of the Year (1): 2018

References

External links

2002 births
21st-century Irish women
Republic of Ireland women's international footballers
Living people
Republic of Ireland women's association footballers
Association footballers from County Dublin
Women's association football forwards
Shelbourne F.C. (women) players
Dublin ladies' Gaelic footballers
Women's National League (Ireland) players
Ladies' Gaelic footballers who switched code
Expatriate women's footballers in England
Irish expatriate sportspeople in England
Women's Super League players
Birmingham City W.F.C. players
Republic of Ireland women's youth international footballers
Expatriate women's footballers in Scotland
Irish expatriate sportspeople in Scotland
Scottish Women's Premier League players
Glasgow City F.C. players